Zao was a progressive rock/zeuhl band that was founded by two ex-members of Magma: Yochk'o Seffer (saxophone, clarinet) and François Cahen (piano). They were active from 1971 to 1994 and released six studio albums.

In 1976, Magma violinist Didier Lockwood also joined the band and appeared on their albums Kawana and Live!.

Members
 Mauricia Platon – vocals
 Yochk'o "Jeff" Seffer – saxophones, clarinets, vocals
 François "Faton" Cahen – piano, keyboards
 Didier Lockwood – violin (1976)
 Joël Dugrenot – bass
 Jean-My Truong – drums
 Gérard Prevost – electric bass
 Piere "Ty Boum" Guignon – percussion
 Michèle Margand – violin
 Marie-Françoise Viaud – violin
 Françoise Douchet – viola
 Claudine Lassere – cello

Discography
 Z=7L (1973)
 Osiris (1975)
 Shekina (1975)
 Kawana (1976)
 Live! (1976)
 Typhareth (1977)
 Akhenaton (1994)
 In Tokyo (2007)

References

External links
 
 Zao at the New Gibraltar Encyclopedia of Progressive Rock

Zeuhl
French musical groups
Jazz fusion ensembles
Musical groups established in 1971
Musical groups from Paris